First Presbyterian Church is a historic Presbyterian church located at Dundee in Yates County, New York. It is a Romanesque style brick structure, with limestone and terra cotta trim, built in 1895. It is distinguished by two multi-story towers, broad cross gables, bold, turret-like pinnacles and finials, and finely crafted corbelled brock trim.

It was listed on the National Register of Historic Places in 2004.

References

Churches on the National Register of Historic Places in New York (state)
Presbyterian churches in New York (state)
Romanesque Revival church buildings in New York (state)
Churches completed in 1895
19th-century Presbyterian church buildings in the United States
Churches in Yates County, New York
National Register of Historic Places in Yates County, New York